Georges Meurdra (born February 12, 1960, in Strasbourg) is a French abstract expressionist sculptor.

Life
Since he graduated from the Valence Art School (École régionale des beaux-arts de Valence, (Drôme), in 1983, Georges Meurdra has mainly devoted himself to metal sculpture. Since his encounter with American sculptor Mark di Suvero, in 1988, he has consistently cooperated with La Vie des Formes for the execution of monumental sculptures, notably in France and in New York. His technique, characterized by a strong determination to work without constraints, has led Meurdra to recommend the use of recycled materials.
Georges Meurdra currently lives and works in France in Beaumont-lès-Valence.

Sculptures in public collections and public spaces

 Ring 1, 1985, Institut d'art contemporain de Villeurbanne, Villeurbanne, France
 Up Saone River, 1988, City of Romans-sur-Isère, Drôme, France
 Face à l'océan, 1992, City of Romans-sur-Isère, Drôme, France
 Kaydara, 2002, City of Caudry, Nord-Pas-de-Calais, France
 Scanda, 2005, City of Chalon-sur-Saône, Saône-et-Loire, France
 Astrolabe, 2011, City of Beaumont-lès-Valence, Drôme, France

External links 
 Georges Meurdra's Official website: 
 Rencontrer Meurdra, l'artiste et l'oeuvre, par Serge Lamothe, 
 Exposition Fer Lumière à la Tour de Crest

Sources 
 Crest : Bois, métal et lumière dans la Tour, Le Dauphiné, 31 juillet 2011.
 Fer Lumière Georges Meurdra – Sculptures / Emmanuel Georges – Photographies, La Fabrique de l'Image, 2011.
 Georges Meurdra, Artiste sculpteur du métal, site officiel de Beaumont-lès-Valence.
 Georges Meurdra – Serge Landois – Daniele Orcier: le Musée de Valence, 22 Déc. 86-31 Janv. 87, Musée des Beaux-Arts et d'Histoire Naturelle. Valence, Rhône, 1987.

20th-century French sculptors
French male sculptors
21st-century French sculptors
21st-century French male artists
1960 births
Living people